One of Those Things is a 1949 thriller novel by the British writer Peter Cheyney. Although best known for his series featuring Lemmy Caution and Slim Callaghan, this was one of several stand-alone novels he wrote featuring hardboiled private detectives. It was also published under the alternative title Mistress Murder.

Synopsis
Irish private eye Terence O’Day attends the Plumpton Races picking up tips about both a horse and a woman, the attractive but treacherous Merys Vanner.

References

Bibliography
 Reilly, John M. Twentieth Century Crime & Mystery Writers. Springer, 2015.
 Hubin, Allen J. Crime Fiction, 1749-1980: A Comprehensive Bibliography. Garland Pub., 1984.

1949 British novels
Novels by Peter Cheyney
British thriller novels
British crime novels
Novels set in London
Novels set in Sussex
William Collins, Sons books